WOJG (94.7 FM, "The Word and The Music") is a radio station broadcasting a gospel music format. Licensed to Bolivar, Tennessee, United States, the station is currently owned by Shaw's Broadcasting Company through licensees Johnny W. Shaw & Opal J. Shaw.

References

External links
 
 

Gospel radio stations in the United States
Hardeman County, Tennessee
Radio stations established in 1976
1976 establishments in Tennessee
OJG